John Linscom Boss Jr. (September 7, 1780 – August 1, 1819) was a U.S. Representative from Rhode Island.

Biography
Born in Charleston, South Carolina, Boss completed preparatory studies.  He studied law, and was admitted to the bar and commenced practice in Newport, Rhode Island.  He served as member of the State house of representatives from 1806 to 1815.

Boss was elected as a Federalist to the Fourteenth and Fifteenth Congresses (March 4, 1815 – March 3, 1819).

He died in Newport, Rhode Island, August 1, 1819, and was interred at the Common Burying Ground and Island Cemetery.

Sources

1780 births
1819 deaths
Politicians from Charleston, South Carolina
Rhode Island lawyers
Burials in Rhode Island
Federalist Party members of the United States House of Representatives from Rhode Island
Burials at Common Burying Ground and Island Cemetery
19th-century American politicians
Lawyers from Charleston, South Carolina
19th-century American lawyers